Böleäng is a residential area in Umeå, Sweden.

External links
Böleäng at Umeå Municipality

Umeå